Roller coasters are amusement rides developed for amusement parks and modern theme parks. Early iterations during the 16th and 17th centuries, which were popular in Russia, were wooden sleds that took riders down large slides made from ice. The first roller coasters that attached a train to a wooden track appeared in France in the early 1800s. Although wooden roller coasters are still being produced, steel roller coasters, introduced in the mid-20th-century, became more common and can be found on every continent except Antarctica.

Amusement parks often compete to build the tallest, fastest, and longest rides to attract thrill seekers and boost overall park attendance. Ranked by height, speed, length, and number of inversions, roller coasters often became the focal point for competing parks. Computer-simulated models led to new innovations that produced more intense thrills while improving quality and durability. The debut of Magnum XL-200 in 1989 at Cedar Point introduced the first complete-circuit roller coaster to exceed , marking a pivot point in the industry. The new era, sometimes referred to as the Coaster Wars, saw increasing competition as parks sought to be the latest to break world records, with some only lasting a year or less.

The pace of competition eventually slowed, however.

Key

Height rankings

Tallest steel roller coasters

Longest steel roller coaster drops

Tallest wooden roller coasters

Longest wooden roller coaster drops

Gallery

Speed rankings

Fastest steel roller coasters

Fastest wooden roller coasters

Gallery

Length rankings

Longest steel roller coasters

Longest wooden roller coasters

Gallery

Inversion rankings
This listing contains all types of roller coaster inversions.

Steel roller coasters

Wooden roller coasters

Notes

References

External links

Roller coaster census at the Roller Coaster DataBase
Top 100 roller coasters on CoasterBuzz

Amusement rides lists
Lists of buildings and structures